Kenai (Kenay) is a city in the Kenai Peninsula Borough in the U.S. state of Alaska. It is one hundred and fifty-eight miles by road southwest from Anchorage. The population was 7,424 as of the 2020 census, up from 7,100 in 2010, the fifteenth-most populated city in the state.

History
The city of Kenai is named after the local Dena'ina word 'ken' or 'kena', which means 'flat, meadow, open area with few trees; base, low ridge', according to the Dena'ina Topical Dictionary by James Kari, Ph.D., published in 2007. This describes the area along the mouth and portion of the Kenai River near the City of Kenai. Archaeological evidence suggests that the area was first occupied by the Kachemak people from 1000 B.C., until they were displaced by the Dena'ina Athabaskan people around 1000 A.D. Before the arrival of the Russians, Kenai was a Dena'ina village called Shk'ituk't, meaning "where we slide down." When Russian fur traders first arrived in 1741, about 1,000 Dena'ina lived in the village. The traders called the people "Kenaitze", which is a Russian term for "people of the flats", or "Kenai people". This name was later adopted when they were incorporated as the Kenaitze Alaskan Natives in the early 1970s.

Fur trade
In 1786, Pytor Zaykov built Nikolaevskaia krepost (Fort Nicholas) for the Lebedev-Lastochkin Company on the site of modern Kenai, being the first European settlement on the Alaskan mainland. Hostilities surfaced between the natives and settlers in 1797, culminating in an incident in which the Dena'ina attacked Fort St. Nicholas, later dubbed the battle of Kenai. Over one hundred deaths occurred from all involved parties. Later, in 1838, the introduction of smallpox killed one half of the Dena'ina population.

United States

In 1869, after the Alaska Purchase, the United States Army established a post called Fort Kenay. It was soon abandoned.

In 1895–96, the Holy Assumption of the Virgin Mary Russian Orthodox Church was built in the village. It is still in use today.

The establishment of shipping companies in the early 1900s broadened Kenai into a port city. Canning companies were established and helped fuel the commercial fishing boom that was the primary activity through the 1920s.

In 1940, homesteads were opened in the area. The first dirt road from Anchorage was constructed in 1951; pavement would not arrive until 1956 with the construction of the Kenai Spur Highway.

A military base, Wildwood Army Station (later Wildwood Air Force Station), was established in 1953, and served as a major communications post. Wildwood was conveyed in 1974 to the Kenai Native Association in partial settlement of Alaska Native land claims. The facility was leased and later purchased by the State of Alaska and presently serves as the Wildwood Correctional Complex.

Statehood
In 1965, offshore oil discoveries in Cook Inlet caused a period of rapid growth. They were a part of a series of oil deposits located during the middle of the 20th century. This was the first major oil discovery in Alaska.

In 1992 and 2011, Kenai was named one of the All-America Cities.

In 2008, the Kenai River was designated as a Category 5, or "impaired," water body by the State of Alaska in accordance with the federal Clean Water Act. The Kenai River Working Group (KRWG) was formed to address the issue of water pollution. By 2010, the status of the river was changed to a Category 2, or "water that attains its designated uses."

Geography
Kenai is located at  (60.558738, −151.229616), on the west side of the Kenai Peninsula near the outlet of the Kenai River to the Cook Inlet of the Pacific Ocean.

Climate
As with much of Southcentral Alaska, Kenai has a moderate dry-summer subarctic climate (Köppen climate classification: Dsc) due to the cool summers. There are 37 nights of sub- lows annually, and the area lies in USDA Plant Hardiness Zone 4, indicating an average annual minimum in the −20 to −30 °F (−29 to −34 °C) range. Summers are cool due to the marine influence, with + highs or + lows being extremely rare.

Demographics

Kenai first appeared on the 1880 U.S. Census as the unincorporated "Creole" (mixed Russian and Native people) village of Kenai Rédoute. It was simply shortened to Kenai with the 1890 census. It was officially incorporated in 1960.

As of the census of 2020, there were 7,424 people, 3,143 households, and 1,788 families residing in the city. The racial makeup of the city was 74.4% White, 0.8% Black or African American, 12.0% Native American, 2.7% Asian, 1.3% Pacific Islander, and 6.7% from two or more races. 6.5% of the population were Hispanic or Latino of any race.

There were 3,143 households, out of which 40.7% had children under the age of 18 living with them, 50.5% were married couples living together, 12.2% had a female householder with no husband present, and 31.8% were non-families. 26.3% of all households were made up of individuals, and 6.1% had someone living alone who was 65 years of age or older. The average household size was 2.45 and the average family size was 3.20.

In the city population was spread out, with 32.8% under the age of 18, 7.7% from 18 to 24, 31.3% from 25 to 44, 21.8% from 45 to 64, and 6.4% who were 65 years of age or older. The median age was 32 years. For every 100 females, there were 97.7 males. For every 100 females age 18 and over, there were 96.6 males.

The median income for a household in the city was $45,962, and the median income for a family was $61,348. Males had a median income of $48,371 versus $27,112 for females. The per capita income for the city was $20,789. About 8.2% of families and 13.4% of the population were below the poverty line, including 12.5% of those under age 18 and 4.2% of those age 65 or over.

Transportation
The main road access to Kenai is via the Kenai Spur Highway, which branches off of the Sterling Highway in downtown Soldotna and winds through downtown and the portions of city limits north of the Kenai River.  The Warren Ames Memorial Bridge, located within city limits and the Kenai River's farthest downriver crossing, provides access to the portions of city limits south of the river and to Kalifornsky Beach Road, the latter providing an alternate access to Soldotna and the outlying road network.  Beaver Loop Road provides access to neighborhoods and parklands upriver of the bridge.

Although many fishing boats are based in Kenai, the city does not have a formal port and harbor. There are docks for offloading the catch, but commercial fishing boats are generally moored offshore in the Kenai River. The nearest deep water port is in Nikiski, but is primarily reserved for use by the oil and gas extraction industry. The Kenai Airport has regularly scheduled flights to Anchorage.

Fishing

In 1985, a world record largest sport-caught Chinook (or "king") salmon was taken from the Kenai River, weighing in at 97 lbs 4oz. Eight of the ten largest king salmons caught in the world have come from the same river, making the city a popular fishing tourist location.

The lower reaches of the Kenai River, including its mouth where it empties into Cook Inlet, are within city limits.  This area is the site of a designated personal use dipnet fishery during the month of July, one of a number of such fisheries throughout various parts of Alaska, that is open annually to residents of the state. The dipnetting season and fishing limitations are set by the Alaska Department of Fish and Game, and require fishermen to carry personal use fishing permits and only fish within designated regions and limits. Because the fishery is easily accessible and open to all Alaska residents, participation has grown over time, creating a significant strain on city resources as they deal with litter, fish waste, fire hazards and other issues associated with having in excess of ten thousand extra persons in the city during this period.

Sister cities
  Akita, Japan

Notable people
 Philip H. Ross, U.S. Navy Rear Admiral, double Navy Cross recipient

See also
 Kenai River
 Coral Seymour Ballpark
 Peninsula Clarion, a regional paper published in Kenai
 Alaska Common Law School

References

External links

 
  of the City of Kenai
 

Cities in Alaska
Cities in Kenai Peninsula Borough, Alaska
Populated coastal places in Alaska on the Pacific Ocean
Populated places in Russian America